SpaceOps (also referred to as the International Committee on Technical Interchange for Space Mission Operations and Ground Data Systems) is an international committee organisation formed in 1992 to "promote and maintain an international community of space operations experts".

Currently, thirteen space agencies are members of the organization. SpaceOps also has non-space agency members from academia and industry.

Conferences 
SpaceOps Organization has held fifteen biennial conferences hosted by various countries around the world. These international fora have discussed operations principles, methods, cross-support  and tools, management and technical interchange.

Most Recent Conferences 
 Daejeon, South Korea, hosted by: KARI, 2016
 Marseille, France, CNES, 2018
 Capetown, South Africa, SANSA, 2021. It was held virtually and was shifted from the original 2020 date due to COVID-19.

Next Conferences 
 Dubai, UAE, hosted by: MBRSC, March 2023.
 Montreal, Canada, CSA, 2025

Publications
In 2004, the AIAA Space Operations and Support Technical Committee partnered with the SpaceOps Organization  to publish the Journal of Space Operations & Communicator, a peer-reviewed journal dedicated to spaceflight operations and ground support.

Since 2006 most of the conference hosts have decided to publish a post-conference vook. These books contain around 30 of the best papers that have been handed in for the conference. The selected papers were all updated, corrected and in many cases extended by the authors following their nomination at the conference.

Awards program
Through its awards program, the SpaceOps Organization recognizes outstanding achievement by individuals and teams in the space operations field. The “International SpaceOps Exceptional Achievement Medal". award recognizes an individual who has distinguished himself or herself in the field of space operations and support.

References

External links
 SpaceOps Website
 Journal of SpaceOperations & Commincator

Space advocacy organizations
Spaceflight